A list of films released in Japan in 1954 (see 1954 in film).

List of films

See also
1954 in Japan

References

Footnotes

Sources

External links
Japanese films of 1954 at the Internet Movie Database

1954
Japanese
Films